Festival Hall may refer to:
Brisbane Festival Hall, an indoor arena, located in Brisbane, Queensland, Australia
Festival Hall (Melbourne), a multi-use hall in Melbourne, Victoria, Australia
Festival Hall, Osaka, a concert hall, in Kita-ku, Osaka, Japan. The Hall seats 2,709 patrons and is home to the Osaka Philharmonic Orchestra
Royal Festival Hall, London
Festival Hall at the 1904 St. Louis World's Fair
A horse, the 1998 winner of the Beresford Stakes

Architectural disambiguation pages